Norman William Calladine (July 30, 1914 — March 23, 1988) was a Canadian ice hockey centre who played three seasons in the National Hockey League for the Boston Bruins from 1942–43 to 1944–45.

Calladine played sixty-three career NHL games, scoring nineteen goals and twenty-nine assists for forty-eight points.

Career statistics

Regular season and playoffs

External links
 
 

1914 births
1988 deaths
Baltimore Orioles (ice hockey) players
Boston Bruins players
Boston Olympics players
Canadian ice hockey centres
Hershey Bears players
Ice hockey people from Ontario
Philadelphia Ramblers players
Providence Reds players
Sportspeople from Peterborough, Ontario
Washington Lions players